Bruening is a surname. Notable people with the surname include:

Adolph von Bruening (1837–1884), German chemist
Justin Bruening (born 1979), American actor and former fashion model
Alexa Havins (born 1980), American actress, wife of Justin

See also
Henry C. and Wilhelmina Bruening House, in Portland, Oregon

References